Sorbus commixta, the , is a species of flowering plant in the family Rosaceae, native to Japan, Sakhalin (in the Russian Far East), and the Korean island of Ulleungdo.

Name
The specific epithet commixta means "mixed or mingled together".

Description
The flowers are 6–10 mm in diameter, with five white petals and 20 yellowish-white stamens; they are produced in corymbs  in diameter in late spring to early summer. The fruit is a bright orange to red pome 7–8 mm in diameter, maturing in autumn.

Plants from Hokkaidō, the Kuril Islands and Sakhalin are sometimes distinguished as Sorbus commixta var. sachalinensis, with larger leaflets up to 9 cm long.

Cultivation and uses
Outside its native range, it is grown as an ornamental tree, hardy in zones 5-9. It grows best in moist, well-drained soil, in full sun. A number of cultivars have been selected, the most popular being 'Embley' (with fastigiate branching) and 'Serotina' (flowering later in early summer). 'Embley' has gained the Royal Horticultural Society's Award of Garden Merit.

References

commixta
Flora of Japan
Trees of Korea